Tim D. Faust (born October 1, 1959) is a Minnesota politician and former member of the Minnesota House of Representatives. A member of the Minnesota Democratic–Farmer–Labor Party (DFL), he represented District 11B, which included portions of Kanabec and Pine counties.

Early life, education, and career
Faust attended the North Dakota State University, graduating with a Bachelor of Science in agricultural economics. He is the pastor of the Zion Lutheran Churches in Hinckley (Cloverdale) and Markville and a singer who has taken part in several area community-theater musicals.

Minnesota House of Representatives

Elections
Faust was first elected in 2006, and reelected in 2008. He was unseated by Republican Roger Crawford in the 2010 election, but ran for the House again in 2012 and was elected. He was then unseated by Republican Jason Rarick in 2014.

Committee assignments
During his first four years in the House, Faust was a member of the House Agriculture, Rural Economies and Veterans Affairs Committee, the K-12 Education Policy and Oversight Committee, and the Ways and Means Committee (of which he was vice chair). He also served on the Agriculture, Rural Economies and Veterans Affairs Subcommittee for the Veterans Affairs Division, and the Finance Subcommittee for Agriculture, Rural Economies and Veterans Affairs Finance Division.

References

External links

Project Vote Smart - Rep. Tim Faust Profile
Follow the Money - Tim D. Faust Campaign Contributions
2008 2006 2004

1959 births
21st-century American politicians
American Lutherans
Living people
Democratic Party members of the Minnesota House of Representatives
North Dakota Democrats
North Dakota State University alumni
People from Hinckley, Minnesota
Politicians from Minneapolis